Kilburn is a suburb in the inner north of Adelaide, South Australia. The suburb borders Blair Athol, Gepps Cross, Wingfield, Regency Park and Prospect. Kilburn has the same postcode (5084) as Blair Athol and was previously known as 'Little Chicago' before its name was changed during the 20th century.

Education
The only school in Kilburn is St Brigids Primary School, a private Catholic school located on Le Hunte Street. It caters for year levels Reception to Year 6. St Gabriels Primary School is located nearby in the easterly adjacent suburb of Enfield on Whittington Street.

Transport
Kilburn is a 10- to 15-minute drive from the CBD (Central Business District). The suburb is well-serviced by public transport. The G10 and G11 buslines pass through Kilburn and Blair Athol along Prospect Road. Kilburn train station, located on Railway Terrace, has services that go to and from the city. Buses 235, 237, 238 and 239 traverse Kilburn along Churchill Road and terminate at Kilburn, Valley View, Mawson Lakes UniSA and Arndale Shopping Centre respectively.

Heritage listings
Kilburn has a number of heritage-listed sites, including:
 Churchill Road: Islington Railway Workshops Chief Mechanical Engineer's Office
 Churchill Road: Islington Railway Workshops Fabrication Shop
 Churchill Road: Islington Railway Workshops Foundry
 Churchill Road: Islington Railway Workshops Apprentice School
 Churchill Road: Islington Railway Workshops Electrical Shop
 Churchill Road: Islington Railway Workshops Fabrication Shop Annex
 498 Churchill Road: Tubemakers Administration Building No. 2
 500 Churchill Road: Tubemakers Administration Building No. 1

See also
 Churchill Road
 List of Adelaide suburbs

References

External links
City of Port Adelaide Enfield

Suburbs of Adelaide